Benas Šatkus (born 1 April 2001) is a Lithuanian professional footballer who plays as a centre-back for VfL Osnabrück and the Lithuania national team.

Club career

1. FC Nürnberg
In 2020, Šatkus signed his first professional contract with 1. FC Nürnberg. In German he played from summer of the 2020. He appeared for the reserves, competing in Fußball-Regionalliga Bayern.

VfL Osnabrück
In the summer of 2022, Šatkus moved to 3. Liga club VfL Osnabrück.

International career 
Šatkus made his international debut for Lithuania national team on 17 November 2019 in a friendly match against New Zealand, which finished as a 1–0 home win.

References

External links
 
 
 
 

2001 births
Living people
Sportspeople from Klaipėda
Lithuanian footballers
Association football central defenders
Lithuania international footballers
Lithuania under-21 international footballers
Lithuania youth international footballers
Regionalliga players
1. FC Nürnberg players
1. FC Nürnberg II players
VfL Osnabrück players
Lithuanian expatriate footballers
Lithuanian expatriate sportspeople in Germany
Expatriate footballers in Germany